The awards were hosted by Janet Suzman on 18 June 1997 - Park Lane Hotel, London.

There were 7 awards in 6 categories: National Print, Periodicals, Photojournalism, Radio, Television Documentary and Television News. Two awards were issued in the National Print category.

The overall winner was Lindsey Hilsum, Diplomatic Correspondent for the ITN Channel Four News Team for her body of work over through 1996-97 from Rwanda and the former Zaire (Now Democratic Republic of the Congo)

The year's judges for all categories Keiko Itoh, John Mortimer QC, Norma Johnston, Sharon Welch, Marc Riboud, Cristina Odone and James Naughtie.

Following the awards, Peter Bottomley MP placed an Early day motion before the UK Parliament requesting that parliament agree "That this House notes the importance of the Amnesty International Press Awards, ...recognises that links with victims are usually achieved through the Press and broadcasters; and acknowledges that the search for the truth is sometimes a ticket to jail or worse for journalists."

Awards 1997

See also

Notes

References

External links
 Amnesty International UK (AIUK) website
 Amnesty International UK Media Awards at the AIUK Website
 Amnesty International Website

Amnesty International
British journalism awards
Human rights awards
1997 awards in the United Kingdom
1997 in London
June 1997 events in the United Kingdom